Reynaldo Charrier (born 1945) is a Chilean geologist who has contributed to the tectonostratigraphy of Chile. In 2000 he received the award "Premio Juan Brüggen".

References

20th-century Chilean geologists
Living people
University of Chile alumni
Academic staff of the University of Chile
1945 births